Sekhar Das (alternately spelled Shekhar Das) is a Bengali film/theatre director, scriptwriter/playwright, actor and producer. He has three award-winning feature films to his credit. Jogajog (Relationships) based on Nobel Laureate Rabindranath Tagore's classic novel has been his 11th feature film, of which four features were made for television release and others for theatre release. He also made over 20 short films for Television and umpteen nos of documentaries and travelogue. Das also teaches film/drama as invited faculty;writes on his subject for different magazines. He served as a jury in different film festivals in India and abroad.

Resigning from a highly successful corporate career in 1997, Sekhar started his professional career in films and television, although he earned highest reputation as an actor par excellence but preferred writing scripts in the initial stage of his career, one of which, namely, Prohor won the national and International awards. Soon he took up direction in TV and films. Directed many mystery thrillers for a leading TV channel, possibly he is the only director internationally known to have adapted great Russian Playwright Anton Chekov's all four classics in Bengali for TV film. A globe trotter that he has been, Sekhar Das had been associated with a travelogue program for a TV Channel for nearly three years as presenter, writer and director. This program covered Europe, particularly France and Germany, from Asia, it was Vietnam, Malaysia, Singapore, Australia.

He served on the juries for different international film festivals, was also jury for the national awards in India, and he was selected as one of the selection committee members for nominating Indian film to Oscar.

Early life
Graduating from the University of Calcutta in both science and English literature, Sekhar Das, learned a bit of French from Alliance Francais de Calcutta, keeping his masters in English literature incomplete, Das opted for film studies and appreciation in the Chitrabani (Communication centre of St Xaviers college, Calcutta). After receiving outstanding certificates in different streams of cinema, Das took serious interest in the Art of Screenplay writing and acting. He was lucky to learn the art of scripting from the Master screen play writer Jean Claude Carrier.

Theatre days
While working for an insurance company, Sekhar Das somehow lost interest in cinema and concentrated in theatre arts. He had the rare opportunity to meet and discuss theatre with directors of international repute like Peter Brook, Jerzy Grotowsky, Richard Secchner, Eugenio Barba, and with Indian theatre directors like Habib Tanvir and Badal Sarkar. He produced and directed dozens of plays some of which are Sophocles’ Oedipus, Chekov’s Uncle Vanya, Tagore’s ‘Visarjan’ (The sacrifice), Tasher Desh (The land of Cards), Rather Rashi (The rope of the Chariot), Jean-Paul Sartre’s ‘Condemned of Altona’, Arrabal’s 'Picnique in the Battlefield’, Dario Foe’s "Can’t pay, Won’t pay", Athol Fugard’s Road to Mecca, Arnold Weskar’s trilogy and many other plays. He excelled as an actor too and during those days he had the opportunity to meet Indian directors Satyajit Ray, Mrinal Sen and Budhhadeb Dasgupta.

Filmography
From 1997 onwards Sekhar Das left his association with Insurance company to join in the Television and cinema professionally. From 1997 to 2000 he wrote for award winning television programmes as also wrote for highly popular television series. He directed short films and long videos during that period. But in 2000 he decided to quite Television and concentrated on Films:-

He adopted 4 great plays of Anton Chekov,(Three Sisters, Uncle Vanya, The Seagull, Cherry Orchard) for Television with unique idiom of cinematic drama.

Following are the films he made for Theatre release:

Mahulbanir Sereng (Songs of Mahulbani) – script & direction Sekhar Das, surprised many by his remarkable debut with the film ‘Mahulbanir Sereng ( The Songs of Mahulbani ), based on the story by Tapan Badyopaghya, the film was marked as first ever Bengali film dealt comprehensively with the lives in the forest ( Jangolmohal). It was a mesmerizing experience for the film lovers for the beautiful songs and its kaleidoscopic view of the nature, the tribal people, their struggle, romance and agony. Critically acclaimed internationally, Mahulbanir Sreng is now a part of history for its commercial success also. It was honored in the Indian Panorama and got 11 awards conferred upon by BFJA.

Krantikaal (Critical encounter) – script & direction. His second film  ‘Krantikaal’ (Critical encounter)based on the story by Prafulla Roy, was again a winner for its novelty of the subject that dealt with the secessionist problems of North-Eastern part of India and its treatment. Government of India selected the film for international viewing in seven international languages. This low budget experimental film, a gem of piece was also honored in the Indian Panorama, got two National awards, four International awards and six BFJA awards.

Kaler Rakhal (The Understudy) – script & direction. By his third film ‘Kaler Rakhal’ ( The Understudy), an operatic musical which portrayed lives of colourful ‘Bahurupis’ (The itinerant performers) Das added another entry to his ‘outsiders’ series, completing the trilogy on ‘contemporary social issues’. Got the ‘Best achievement of the year award from BFJA and international awards.By this Das completes his trilogy on contemporary India

Necklace: Film Necklace, Script and direction by Sekhar Das, a bitter-sweet comedy surprised many for Sekhar’s control over film media and competency to deal with various subjects. The film was dedicated to the 50 year celebration of French new wave. Running successfully with rave reviews in India, USA and Canada since last September 2011, this has been Das' 1st part of "Kolkata" trilogy.

‘Nayanchampar dinratri’ (The tale of Nayanchampa): Story, script, direction by Sekhar Das, is a compassionate human document connecting two poles of our contemporary society -Rural and Urban. It records a day of a Maid’s life.  The story revolves around 'Nayanchampa'(Roopa Ganguly), a middle aged lady representing thousands of women of rural India like her. They start their journey in the early dawn and travel around 8 hours a day to reach the city, serve different households to earn their livelihood and return home in the night when they again work hard to feed their family. Through 'Nayanchampa' not only we get to see the suppressed sorrows and secret aspirations of different representatives of urban society in the present socio-political situation but we also watch the hapless condition of women of rural India,  although, very often they remain as the sole bread earners of their family . 
Film was shot in the documentary style during monsoon, in the rain soaked city of Kolkata and around different suburb locations with a hand held camera. This has been Das' 2nd part of "Kolkata" trilogy.

ESP: Ekti Rohoshshyo Golpo (ESP: A film fantastic): Script and Direction by Sekhar Das. The film is on Paula and her nocturnal hallucinations around her loving husband, Spandan. Their physician dismisses her symptoms as relating to insomnia. Their charming, young paying guest, Banya, is a student of psychology. Banya,  discovers that Paula has an uncanny ability to predict the future. She connects her condition to that of Extra Sensory Perception (ESP), which her professor of para-psychology, Dr. Maity, confirms when Paula undergoes Zener card tests. Further findings indicate that Paula is under severe trauma due to her past. At the time of her puberty, a temple priest (who was a dwarf) had physically abused her. He now visits her every night in her hallucinations. Further strange developments compound the investigations.

Jogajog (Relationships):
The film is a contemporary interpretation of Rabindranath Tagore’s classic novel (written on 1927 and later adopted to drama, 1930’s). The plot revolves around the underlying rivalry between two families — the Chatterjees (Biprodas), aristocrats now on the decline and the Ghosals (Madhusudan), representing neo-bourgeoisie and arrogance. Biprodas Chatterjee is a vociferous supporter of equal dignity and rights for women. Kumudini, Biprodas' sister, is caught between the two as she is married off to Madhusudan. She was brought up in a sheltered home where she had followed the traditional way of life and observed all the religious rituals. Her mental image of the husband is as someone who embodies all the qualities of the God (Lord Krishna) she worships. Now, she is rudely shaken by the crude display of wealth and power by Madhusudan. Although brought up to be a good and submissive wife, she resents at the idea of sharing the conjugal bed. But for Madhusudan money means power and marriage means sex, he repeatedly tries to use this to jeer at Kumudini's family; his natural vulgarity, the coarseness of his speech, his arrogant discourtesy made Kumudini's whole being shrank every moment. Soon Kumudini retreated to her shell of spirituality. But a time finally comes when Kumudini cannot take it anymore and she returns to her brother's house, only to realize that she is pregnant. Eventually an unwilling Kumudini is persuaded to return to the Ghoshals. The film also highlights marital rape. Kumudini is subjected to marital rape by Madhusudan. There is also a sexual liaison between Madhusudan and Shyamasundari, the widow of Madhusudan's elder brother.

Director

4 great Chekov Plays (2001)

Full length plays adapted for television release
Tin Bon (Three sisters)
Bhola Mama (Uncle Vanya)
Balaka (The Seagul)
Golap Kutir (Cherry Orchard)

Films made for theatre release
Mahulbanir Sereng [Songs of Mahulbani] (2004)
Krantikaal [Critical encounter] (2005)
Kaaler Rakhal [The Understudy] (2008)
Bishnu Dey [documentary film] (2010)
Necklace (2011)
E S P (unreleased, 2012)
Nayan Chapar Dinratri (The tale of Nayanchampa) (unreleased, 2013)
Jogajog (Relationships) (2015)

Screenplay and dialogue

''''"Chekov Plays" (2001) for television
Mahulbanir Sereng (Songs Of Mahulbani) 2004
Krantikaal (Critical Encounter) 2005
Kaler Rakhal (The Understudy) 2008
Necklace (2010)
E S P-A film fantastic (2012)
Nayanchampar dinratri (The tale of Nayanchampa) 2013
Jogajog (Relationships) 2015

Awards
 Mahulbanir Sereng'': Best film, best director, best screenplay, best art director, best character actor, best story from BFJA, in Indian Panoama 2003
 Krantikaal: Best regional film National award (2005), best character actor, National award. Best Director in 9th Dhaka International Film Festival. Best actor (Roopa Ganguly) in 9th Dhaka International Film Festival, Best film from Signis award (Belgium), special jury, Osien cinefan. Indian Panorama 2005
 Kaler Rakhal: Best achievement of the year (2008) from BFJA, Best sound design from Ahmedabad international

See also
Mahulbanir Sereng
Krantikaal

References

Bengali film directors
Bengali Hindus
1952 births
Living people
University of Calcutta alumni
Indian film directors
Bengali screenwriters
21st-century Indian screenwriters
Indian screenwriters
21st-century Indian film directors
Film directors from Kolkata
Screenwriters from Kolkata
dramatists and playwrights from West Bengal
actors from Kolkata
Indian dramatists and playwrights
21st-century Indian dramatists and playwrights